Konda Subbarama Das (5 January 1936 – 8 June 2012) or Doss was an Indian film director and film editor. He directed films in many South Indian language films, primarily Telugu and Kannada films.

Career
He was born on 5 January 1936. He worked on about 40 films in different positions. As a director Loguttu Perumallakeruka (1966) was his debut film, with Sobhan Babu and Rajasri playing the lead roles. He has made about 30 films with Telugu superstar Krishna, starting with Takkari Donga Chakkani Chukka (1969), produced by Y.V. Rao. His Mosagallaku Mosagadu (1971) became a trendsetter in Indian films and was dubbed into many languages. He worked with N. T. Rama Rao (Yugandhar), Vishnuvardhan (14 Films), Chiranjeevi (Billaa Ranga, Puli Bebbuli and Roshagadu), Rajinikanth (Iddaru Asaadhyule, Annadammula Savaal, Sahodaral Savaal), Sobhan Babu (Loguttu Perumallakeruka, Girija Kalyanam, Chesina Baasalu).

Death
Das died on 8 June 2012 aged 76 while he was under treatment in Apollo hospital at Chennai

Awards
 Puttanna Kanagal Award from Karnataka State Government

Filmography

References

External links
 
 Interview with K.S.R. Das

Hindi-language film directors
Kannada film directors
Telugu film directors
1936 births
2012 deaths
20th-century Indian film directors
Tamil film directors
Film directors from Andhra Pradesh
People from Nellore district
Kannada screenwriters
Screenwriters from Andhra Pradesh